Solo is an Australian, lemon-flavoured, carbonated soft drink currently manufactured under license by Asahi Breweries. First launched by Tarax in 1968 and fell to Cadbury after a takeover in 1974 its lemon flavour is inspired by Australian pubs' traditional and popular non alcoholic 'pub squash' beverage. The drink's recognition amongst the Australian population has been attributed to the brand's long lasting "Solo Man" marketing campaign, featuring numerous Australian actors. Solo and Asahi Holdings operates in the soft drink manufacturing industry along with various other brands such as Coca-Cola. The usual 375mL can of Solo contains 43.1 grams of sugar. There are and have been in the past, various versions of Solo available. These include Solo Zero, which uses artificial sweetener instead of sugar and there has also been a lemon and lime flavoured variant of the original recipe.

Ingredients

Listed ingredients 

 Carbonated water
 Sugar
 Reconstituted lemon juice (5%)
 Food acids (330, 331) 
 Natural flavour
 Preservative (211) 
 Natural colour (safflower extract)

Additives 

 E330 - Citric acid 
 E331 - Sodium citrates 
 E211 - Sodium benzoate

A typical 375 mL can of Solo contains 43.1 grams of sugar, 0 grams of fat, 0.2 grams of protein and 68 milligrams of sodium, containing 750 kJ of energy.

History 
Solo was launched in 1973 by Cadbury-Schweppes. In April 2009, Asahi Holdings (Australia) Pty Ltd acquired Cadbury-Schweppes Australia and in turn Solo. Asahi is a foreign owned, private company which is owned by Asahi Group Holdings Limited, a Japanese brewery and soft drink company.

The drink's lemon flavour is derived from Australian pubs’ traditional non alcoholic beverage ‘pub squash’ or ‘lemon squash’, which is a drink made from a sweetened lemon concentrate and water. Solo is a carbonated variant of a lemon squash.

In the past, Solo has come out with different variants of its original lemon flavour, namely a lemon lime flavour and zero sugar, which uses artificial sweetener as a substitute for sugar.

Marketing

Solo Man 
Solo Man is the long lasting marketing campaign which begun in the 1970s after the release of the drink. The most recent Solo Man advertisement was released in 2018. With a history of almost 50 years, the Solo Man marketing campaign tracks an Australian man partaking in adventurous and extreme sports in order to ‘earn’ the drink. Solo Man has been portrayed as a very ‘macho’, traditionally masculine man. The 2018 “thirst worthy effort” campaign launched by TBWA\Melbourne redefines the Solo Man by partaking in more domestic activities.

Activities in which the Solo Man would partake in with their relevant YouTube videos are listed:

 Kayaking down rapids
 Riding a wagon towed by horses
 Riding a catamaran
 Driving a yellow speed boat
 Wrestling a brumby
 Playing squash
 Horse riding
 Fishing for a shark
 Windsurfing
 Arm wrestling
 Doing a triathlon
 Safety rafting down rapids
 Kayaking off a cliff
 Wrestling a saltwater crocodile
 Driving a jeep through a store
 Fixing a jetty as a carpenter and wakeboarding on an esky lid
 Dragging a shark home
 Chasing a barrel of lemons

Ad slogans including "The thirst crusher" and "Light on the fizz, so you can slam it down fast" were used in advertising until the early 1990s. A tag line common in the television advertisements in the 1970s and 1980s was: "You've never tasted a lemon drink like Solo before. Unless it's one of those great lemon squashes that pubs used to make. Extra lemon tang, and not too many bubbles. Solo lemon: a man's drink.".

In 2012, the Solo Man was re-introduced by BMF advertising agency as part of a new Solo advertising campaign, and starred Adam Demos. This is the origin story of the Solo Man who is swinging an axe in colonial Australia, puts lemons in a barrel that rolls away and gives chase down hills, later chugging the entire barrel himself in the Solo Man stance. In this year, BMF advertising agency also created a new tagline for Solo: “Go hard, go solo”. This involved Solo Man partaking in an obstacle course to earn the drink. In this year, BMF also introduced limited edition designs on solo cans as a social media promotion strategy. It involved the cans’ design having one letter or a hashtag out of the 7 potentials: #, G, O, H, A, R, D.

In 2018, Solo changed the original character traits of Solo Man by portraying him with a less macho presentation. In these commercials he is a dad who makes costumes for a play, has a dog and puts together flat pack furniture. It came with the tag line "A Thirst Worthy Effort".

Solo Man actors 
The first "Solo Man" character was acted by Michael Ace, a former PE Teacher at St Paul's Catholic college in Manly, on Sydney's Northern beaches. Michael Ace had a second career as a model and starred as Solo Man in the 70s and 80s.

Another Solo Man was Terry Creasey, the father of Australian actor and television presenter Joel Creasey. Terry Creasey was also a male model and starred as Solo Man in the 1980s. Terry Creasey featured as the Solo Man who runs up a hill with a dog and drinks a can of Solo at the top.

In the mid 1980s, Mark Robert Coutelas also acted as Solo Man, donning a moustache and a mullet, featuring in the ad where Solo Man kayaks of a cliff face and white water rafting down rapids.

In 2012, Australian actor Adam Demos, born in Wollongong, NSW, Australia, featured as Solo Man. Adam Demos’ Solo Man was known as the one who chased a barrel full of lemons down a hill and drank/poured the lemon juice over him on the top of a cliff. Adam Demos has also starred in the TV series “Sex/Life”, the movie “Falling inn love”, and TV series “Rescue Special Ops”.

Sport sponsorship 
In 2009, Schweppes Australia commenced a three-year partnership deal with Football Australia, whereby the 'Goal of the Year' was known as 'SOLO Goal of the year. BMF advertising featured Australian football player Harry Kewell. This campaign was an attempt to bring 'crushed can football' back to Australian streets. This game involves crushing a Solo can after finishing the drink and kicking it around on the street.

In 2011, prior to the Football world cup in South Africa, Solo and BMF launched an online campaign called 'lucky undies' in support of the Australian Socceroos. This campaign involved the production of 225,000 garments of yellow underwear to be sold online or with the drink. Paired with a 1-minute advertisement on TV, the rest of the marketing was left to social media. The result of this was a subsequent 31,000 fan film views on social media. On May 24, 2010, Spectators of a Socceroos match held in Melbourne were handed these bright yellow underwear to wear over their clothes.

Masculinity in marketing 
Positioned as a highly masculine drink, Solo adopts masculine marketing techniques and targets a male audience in their brand image, advertising campaigns and television commercials. This marketing strategy incorporates techniques such as portraying men through "bravery, adventurousness, being able to think rationally, being strong and effective".

Historically, Solo's advertising techniques have been focused on the traditional and stereotypical aspects of masculinity in their marketing campaigns. The macho nature of the Solo Man is evident in the character partaking in extreme sports in order to ‘earn’ the drink. The portrayal of Solo Man follows common techniques used in gender advertisements. These techniques include men being alert and conscious of surroundings, standing upright, gripping things tightly with their hands, eyes open and looking around, controlled bodies, being serious and being physically active. Since being launched, Solo has progressed this masculine advertising through different extreme sporting adventures.

Solo's marketing campaign predominantly focuses on the male demographic in Australia. The reasoning for this can be attributed to the fact that in Australia in the 2017-2018 period, men were two times more likely to have a soft drink per day compared to women.

Since 2018, Solo's “thirst worthy effort” campaign produced by TBWA advertising agency reconsiders the initial idea of what it meant to be a Solo Man. Breaking from tradition, the advertising adapts to society's changing cultural perception of gender norms and redefines the Solo Man to partake in more domestic and household activities, such as constructing furniture and making costumes for a school play.

Consumption 
Throughout the course of Solo's production, the average intake of soft drink has declined amongst the Australian population. In 1993–1994, an average of 104.5 litres of soft drink were consumed per person in Australia. This peaked in 1995-96 when an average of 115.20 litres of soft drink were consumed per Australian. Since 1996, the average intake of soft drink has been declining, where in the year 2021–2022, an average of 72.7 litres were consumed. This number is predicted to decline to 65.9 litres by 2027–28.

Solo, being a sweetened soft drink, falls under a highly consumed beverage category in Australia. A study in 2017-2018 shows 48% of adults in Australia consume at least one sugar sweetened drink per week, and 9.1% of adults and 7.1% of children consume at least one per day.

Health concerns 
There is a decline in soft drink consumption in Australia, which can be attributed to the rise in health concerns among the Australian population. Solo has a high sugar content which has been proven to be associated with health concerns, when consumed often.  Obesity and type 2 diabetes has a direct correlation to excess sugar intake. A high intake in sugar can also correspond to a heightened risk in developing dental caries and other issues such as cardiovascular disease, mental health issues and rheumatoid arthritis.

In response to these rising health concerns associated with high sugar content, Asahi beverages and subsequently Solo signed a sugar reduction pledge in 2018. Solo aims to reduce its sugar content by 20% by the year 2025. Other Companies that signed this pledge include Coca-Cola and PepsiCo.

Competitors 
In Australia, Solo competes with various other soft drinks that offer different flavours and prices. In 2020, Asahi Holdings (which owns Solo) held 15.4% market share in the Australian soft drink manufacturing market. Coca-Cola Amatil Limited owned the majority of the market at 39.8% market share. Solo mainly competes with brands owned by Coca-Cola Amatil Limited, namely Coca-Cola, Fanta, Sprite and Kirks. Smaller brands also compete with Solo such as soft drinks owned by Tru Blu Beverages (namely Pub squash, Pips and Vida) which have 4-5% market share and Bundaberg Brewed Drinks Pty Ltd who have 3-4% market share.

Overseas markets 
Cadbury Schweppes sold a similar citrus drink named Rondo in the United States market during the late 1970s and '80s.

Using the Australian Solo as an inspiration, Cadbury-Schweppes has also sold an energy drink in the U.S. called Coolah Energy. Similar to Solo, its listed ingredients included lemon flavour but with 150 mg of caffeine. It used the tagline "Energy from Down Under" and listed boronia as an ingredient, a citrus plant in Australia known more worldwide for use in floral arrangements than its fruit or energy. Coolah Energy has since been discontinued.

See also
Lift
Coca-Cola
Mountain Dew

References

External links
 Schweppes website
 Asahi Holdings website
 TBWA\Australia website
 BMF advertising agency website

Lemon sodas
Products introduced in 1973
Australian drinks
Australian brands
Lemon-lime sodas
Asahi Breweries
Soft drinks